Acton (population 9,377 in 2021) is a community located in the town of Halton Hills, in Halton Region, Ontario, Canada. At the northern end of the Region, it is on the outer edge of the Greater Toronto Area and is one of two of the primary population centres of the Town; the other is Georgetown. From 1842 until 1986, the town was a major centre for the tanning and leather goods industry. In the early years, it was often referred to as "Leathertown".

History

In 1825, the area now known as Acton was settled by the Rev. Ezra, Rev. Zenas, and Rufus Adams. These men were Methodist preachers who took a sabbatical and began farming here on a branch of the Credit River. A fourth brother, Eliphalet, also settled here later.  In the 1840s, the community had a grist mill and tannery. The community was initially named Danville when settler Wheeler Green opened a dry-goods store in 1828. It was later called Adamsville, after the three original settlers.

When the Mississaugas still had their reserve at Port Credit in the 19th Century, they would come up to Acton every spring to tap the sugar bush just south of the village.

In 1856, the Grand Trunk Railway arrived and helped spur growth in the area, especially along Mill Street. By 1869, Acton had businesses that included woodworking mills, tanneries, glove makers and carriage works. Originally part of Esquesing Township, Acton's principal trade was in grain, lumber, cordwood, leather and hops. Under a bylaw passed by the Halton County Council in September 1873, it was incorporated as a village in 1874, and erected into a town in 1950. A new town hall was opened in 1883 (and designated a Heritage Building in 1996); postmaster Robert Swan named the village Acton after the area of Acton, London in England.

In 1926, with the help of Sir Harry Brittain, the Village of Acton was given permission by the Municipal Borough of Acton in Middlesex, England to adopt a variant of the latter's coat of arms, substituting maple leaves for the oak leaves in the original. The municipal council continued to use it until 1974, when Acton amalgamated with the Town of Georgetown and most of the Township of Esquesing to form the Town of Halton Hills.

Leather industry

Tanning has been an important industry in Acton since 1842, when the first tannery was established by Abraham Nelles, as the area was attractive to the leather industry because of the large numbers of hemlock and spruce trees. These provided the tannin required for a firm, high quality leather of a reddish colour.

A number of subsequent owners operated the tannery business, before the Beardmore family purchased it in 1865, running it for over 50 years.  At one time, it was the largest tanner in Canada.

The Beardmores also opened tanneries in other parts of southern Ontario. From 1877 to 1922, they operated another large facility in Bracebridge, having been attracted by the area's large supply of hemlock. It closed due to the decline of American markets around 1920.

By 1889, their main tanneries in Acton were very large, with a combined floor space of almost . They also built a large brick warehouse that year beside the railway tracks. Hides arrived by rail and were taken for processing by horse-drawn wagons and then shipped by rail to customers.

In 1944, the tannery was sold to Canada Packers who ran it until its closure in 1986.

In 1980, three investors decided to transform the tannery's warehouse into the Old Hide House, a retail store with leather clothing, goods and furniture. From 1980 to 1993, the Old Hide House also housed a restaurant, Jack Tanner's Table. The business is famous for its commercial slogan that has been in use for decades, "It's worth the drive to Acton!"

The business was closed at times because of bankruptcy and other reasons, but is currently in operation, although the identity of the owners during parts of its history, and even now, has not been publicized.

Other speciality tanners and leather products manufacturers were also established in the town. These included Hewetson Shoe, Coronna Shoe, Superior Glove, Marzo Glove and Frank Heller and Co. In the early 20th century, Acton was the main urban community of Esquesing Township, much larger than nearby Georgetown, Ontario which now has four times the population.

Because of the extensive tanning industry that was located in the area during the 19th Century and early 20th Century, the area has earned the nickname of Leathertown.

Early transportation

Acton is located at the intersection of Highway 7 and Halton Regional Road 25. GO Transit provides bus and train service on its Kitchener corridor, with a stop at Acton GO Station.

The Grand Trunk brought train service to the area in 1856, and its station was located at Mill Street East and Eastern Avenue next to the Beardmore leather warehouse (now known as the Olde Hide House). Canadian National closed the train station in 1967, but the stop continued to serve both Via Rail and GO Trains until the 1990s.  GO Train service resumed on January 7, 2013.

From 1917 to 1931, Acton was also served by the Toronto Suburban Railway, which early on entered into a notable dispute with the Beardmore tannery over a crossing with a Grand Trunk spur line in the town, that went all the way to the Supreme Court of Canada for resolution.

Actonite or Actonian
In older books and papers of the area, two demonyms have existed for residents of the area at the same time. Actonite was used to identify people who moved to the area, and Actonian referred to people who grew up there. The first designation now predominates, due to the influx of new residents in the 1960s, but older residents still remember it.

Geography
The town's location was chosen because of the good source of water power from the Black Creek, and the flour mill established at the beginning is still in operation today, although its source of power has changed. It is also near the watershed between the Credit River and the Grand River which is just west of the urban area, where the Blue Springs Creek begins. Acton also has Fairy Lake at Prospect Park, which is the fairgrounds for the Acton Fall Fair every September.

Demographics

Sports

Teams and clubs
 Halton Hills Minor Hockey (Halton Hills Thunder):  The 2013-2014 season was the inaugural season of the amalgamation of the Georgetown Minor Hockey Association (Georgetown Raiders) and The Acton Minor Hockey Association (AMHA) (Acton Tanners).  Before this amalgamation, Acton was an Ontario Minor Hockey Association (OMHA) BB centre.  The newly amalgamated association is an Ontario Minor Hockey Association (OMHA) AA-AE centre.
 Acton Chargers Select Hockey and House League
 Acton Curling Club
Acton Ladies Hockey (Eagles)
 Acton Minor Ball
 Acton Skating Club member of Skate Canada-Learn to Skate, Powerskate, Figure Skate
 Acton Villa Soccer Club. Youth and adult soccer, indoor and outdoor
 Acton Aqua Ducks Swim Club, established in 1987
 Halton Hills Minor Lacrosse Association

Government

No longer officially a town (since 1974), Acton is part of the Town of Halton Hills which is divided into four wards, each with two elected Councillors. Two others are Regional Councillors, each representing two wards on Halton Hills Council, and also serve on the Halton Region Council as does the mayor.

The current (2018–2022) membership of the town council is as follows:

Infrastructure
The Acton branch of the Halton Hills Public Library is located at 17 River Street. Initially built as the community's centennial project when it opened in 1967, it was significantly expanded in 2012.

Halton Hills has its own fire department but policing is provided by the Halton Regional Police Services. Halton Hills has its own official plan which came into force in March 2008 and was consolidated in 2017 with the Region's plan.

Education

Media
Acton is covered by local newspapers and television through the following services:
 The Independent & Free Press
 TVCogeco
 The Acton New Tanner
 The Halton Compass
 Acton UP

Notable people

 Judy Fong Bates - author and teacher
 Mazo de la Roche - author, for which Acton provided settings for some of her early novels
 David Henderson - MP (1888, 1891-1917), banker and merchant
 Sir Donald Mann - industrialist and railway entrepreneur
 Jeff McEnery - comic
 Art Moore - Stanley Cup winner with the Ottawa Silver Seven
 Joseph Petric - musician, author, teacher
 Jamie Taras - former professional Canadian football player
 Roz Weston - radio and television personality

See also

 List of unincorporated communities in Ontario

References

Further reading

External links

Neighbourhoods in Halton Hills
Former towns in Ontario
Populated places disestablished in 1974